Wang Limei (born 30 March 1961) is a Chinese speed skater. She competed in the women's 500 metres at the 1980 Winter Olympics.

References

External links
 

1961 births
Living people
Chinese female speed skaters
Olympic speed skaters of China
Speed skaters at the 1980 Winter Olympics
Place of birth missing (living people)